Computer graphics are graphics created by computers and, more generally, the representation and manipulation of pictorial data by a computer.

Computer graphics may also refer to:
 2D computer graphics, the application of computer graphics to generating 2D imagery
 3D computer graphics, the application of computer graphics to generating 3D imagery
 Computer animation, the art of creating moving images via the use of computers
 Computer-generated imagery, the application of the field of computer graphics to special effects in films, television programs, commercials, simulators and simulation generally, and printed media
 Computer graphics (computer science), a subfield of computer science studying mathematical and computational representations of visual objects
 Computer Graphics (publication), the journal by ACM SIGGRAPH
 Computer Graphics: Principles and Practice, the classic textbook by James D. Foley, Andries van Dam, Steven K. Feiner and John Hughes

See also
Display device, the hardware used to present computer graphics
Graphics hardware, the computer hardware used to accelerate the creation of images